Division No. 1 is a census division located within the Eastman Region of the Canadian province of Manitoba. Unlike in some other provinces, census divisions do not reflect the organization of local government in Manitoba. These areas exist solely for the purposes of statistical analysis and presentation; they have no government of their own. 

The Trans-Canada Highway runs through the Eastman Region. Also included in the division are the Buffalo Point First Nation and the Manitoba portion of the Shoal Lake 40 First Nation.

Demographics 

Subdivisions

Towns
Lac du Bonnet
Powerview-Pine Falls

Local government districts

 Pinawa

Rural municipalities

Alexander
Lac du Bonnet
Piney
Reynolds
Stuartburn
Victoria Beach
Whitemouth

First Nations reserves

Shoal Lake 37A
Shoal Lake 39
Shoal Lake 39A
Shoal Lake 40

Unorganized areas

 Unorganized Division 1

References

External links

 Eastman Regional Profile

01

Eastman Region, Manitoba